Crambus sectitermina is a moth in the family Crambidae. It was described by George Hampson in 1910. It is found in Zambia and Zimbabwe.

References

Crambini
Moths described in 1910
Moths of Africa